Dean M. Sylvester (born December 30, 1972) is an American former professional ice hockey player who played in the National Hockey League (NHL).

Career
Sylverster was drafted by the San Jose Sharks in the 1993 NHL Supplemental Draft and spent three seasons in the International Hockey League with the Kansas City Blades, he also played in the East Coast Hockey League for the Mobile Mysticks. In 1998, he signed with the Buffalo Sabres and played one game for the team before being traded to the new expansion team, the Atlanta Thrashers. In the 1999–2000 NHL season, Sylvester scored 16 goals and 26 points in 52 games, placing third and fifth on the Thrashers in goals and points respectively. After one more season with the Thrashers, Sylvester retired from hockey.

Career statistics

External links
 

1972 births
Living people
American men's ice hockey right wingers
Atlanta Thrashers players
Buffalo Sabres players
Ice hockey players from Massachusetts
Kansas City Blades players
Kent State Golden Flashes men's ice hockey players
Michigan State Spartans men's ice hockey players
Mobile Mysticks players
National Hockey League supplemental draft picks
Orlando Solar Bears (IHL) players
Rochester Americans players
San Jose Sharks draft picks
Sportspeople from Weymouth, Massachusetts